USS Cruise (AM/MSF-215) was an Admirable-class minesweeper built for the U.S. Navy during World War II. She was built to clear minefields in offshore waters, and served the Navy in the Pacific Ocean.

She was launched 21 March 1943 by Tampa Shipbuilding Co., Inc., Tampa, Florida; completed by Charleston Navy Yard; and commissioned 21 September 1945, Lieutenant S. F. Luce, USNR, in command.

Cruise visited New York between 19 December 1945 and 5 January 1946, then sailed by way of Guantanamo Bay, Cuba; the Panama Canal Zone; and Salina Cruz, Mexico, for San Pedro, Los Angeles, arriving 3 February.
Originally destined for Pearl Harbor, she was ordered back to the east coast, sailing 20 March and arriving at Galveston, Texas, 22 April.
Sailing on to Philadelphia, Pennsylvania, Cruise was placed out of commission in reserve there on 5 September 1946. She was reclassified MSF-215 on 7 February 1955. On 1 July 1972 she was struck from the Navy List.

MV Gregory Poole 
On 1 March 1973, Cruise was purchased by Beaufort Fisheries, Inc., Beaufort, North Carolina, and converted to a menhaden fisherman and renamed Gregory Poole, official number 558835.

On 10 December 2007, the Gregory Poole was scuttled off the coast of Delaware onto the Del-Jersey-Land Inshore Reef site, to help form an artificial reef.

References

External links 
 

Admirable-class minesweepers
World War II mine warfare vessels of the United States
Ships built in Tampa, Florida
1943 ships
Ships sunk as artificial reefs